The Bogyoke Aung San Museum, located in Bahan, Yangon, is a museum dedicated to General Aung San, the founder of modern Myanmar (Burma). Established in 1962, the two-story museum was Aung San's last residence before his assassination in July 1947. It is a colonial-era villa, built in 1921, where his daughter Aung San Suu Kyi grew up as a child. The museum, with its focus on Gen. Aung San's short adult life, is complementary to the Bogyoke Aung San Residence Museum in Natmauk, Magwe Division, which is dedicated to his childhood and family memorabilia. It houses exhibits on his life story and general memorabilia which includes clothing, books, furniture, family photos and the late general's car.

For many years, the museum was opened only for three hours each year– on the Martyrs' Day of 19 July, from 9 am to 4 pm. The restriction is in line with the current military government's policy of restricting any mention of Gen. Aung San in the media in order to marginalize Aung San Suu Kyi. The museum formally reopened on 24 March 2012.

The museum is listed on the Yangon City Heritage List.

Ground floor displays
The majority of the displays are located at the family room, dining room and living room on the ground floor.
 Photos of his youth at Natmauk, including those of the Buddhist monastery where he received primary education, and other certificates of educational achievements
 Photos at various political activities and during travels abroad
 Displays of his famous speeches
 Family photos
 Other personal mementos such as handwritten notes to his wife Khin Kyi, personal lighter etched Aung San and ash tray, etc.
 Car used for official transport until the day of assassination

Upper floor displays

 Bedroom of Aung San and Khin Kyi
 Bedrooms of their children
 Library
 Meeting room

In the garden
In the garden of the house, there is a bronze statue of Aung San doing gardening work, and also the swimming pool where his middle son Aung San Lin drowned.

References

Museums established in 1962
Museums in Yangon
Family of Aung San